Post-scarcity is a theoretical economic situation in which most goods can be produced in great abundance with minimal human labor needed, so that they become available to all very cheaply or even freely. 

Post-scarcity does not mean that scarcity has been eliminated for all goods and services, but that all people can easily have their basic survival needs met along with some significant proportion of their desires for goods and services. Writers on the topic often emphasize that some commodities will remain scarce in a post-scarcity society.

Models

Speculative technology
Futurists who speak of "post-scarcity" suggest economies based on advances in automated manufacturing technologies, often including the idea of self-replicating machines, the adoption of division of labour which in theory could produce nearly all goods in abundance, given adequate raw materials and energy.

More speculative forms of nanotechnology such as molecular assemblers or nanofactories, which do not currently exist, raise the possibility of devices that can automatically manufacture any specified goods given the correct instructions and the necessary raw materials and energy, and many nanotechnology enthusiasts have suggested it will usher in a post-scarcity world.

In the more near-term future, the increasing automation of physical labor using robots is often discussed as means of creating a post-scarcity economy.

Increasingly versatile forms of rapid prototyping machines, and a hypothetical self-replicating version of such a machine known as a RepRap, have also been predicted to help create the abundance of goods needed for a post-scarcity economy. Advocates of self-replicating machines such as Adrian Bowyer, the creator of the RepRap project, argue that once a self-replicating machine is designed, then since anyone who owns one can make more copies to sell (and would also be free to ask for a lower price than other sellers), market competition will naturally drive the cost of such machines down to the bare minimum needed to make a profit, in this case just above the cost of the physical materials and energy that must be fed into the machine as input, and the same should go for any other goods that the machine can build.

Even with fully automated production, limitations on the number of goods produced would arise from the availability of raw materials and energy, as well as ecological damage associated with manufacturing technologies. Advocates of technological abundance often argue for more extensive use of renewable energy and greater recycling in order to prevent future drops in availability of energy and raw materials, and reduce ecological damage. Solar energy in particular is often emphasized, as the cost of solar panels continues to drop (and could drop far more with automated production by self-replicating machines), and advocates point out the total solar power striking the Earth's surface annually exceeds our civilization's current annual power usage by a factor of thousands.

Advocates also sometimes argue that the energy and raw materials available could be greatly expanded by looking to resources beyond the Earth. For example, asteroid mining is sometimes discussed as a way of greatly reducing scarcity for many useful metals such as nickel. While early asteroid mining might involve crewed missions, advocates hope that eventually humanity could have automated mining done by self-replicating machines. If this were done, then the only capital expenditure would be a single self-replicating unit (whether robotic or nanotechnological), after which the number of units could replicate at no further cost, limited only by the available raw materials needed to build more.

Social 
A World Future Society report looked at how historically capitalism takes advantage of scarcity. Increased resource scarcity leads to increase and fluctuation of prices, which drives advances in technology for more efficient use of resources such that costs will be considerably reduced, almost to zero. They thus claim that following an increase in scarcity from now, the world will enter a post-scarcity age between 2050 and 2075.

Murray Bookchin's 1971 essay collection Post-Scarcity Anarchism outlines an economy based on social ecology, libertarian municipalism, and an abundance of fundamental resources, arguing that post-industrial societies have the potential to be developed into post-scarcity societies. Such development would enable "the fulfillment of the social and cultural potentialities latent in a technology of abundance".

Bookchin claims that the expanded production made possible by the technological advances of the twentieth century were in the pursuit of market profit and at the expense of the needs of humans and of ecological sustainability. The accumulation of capital can no longer be considered a prerequisite for liberation, and the notion that obstructions such as the state, social hierarchy, and vanguard political parties are necessary in the struggle for freedom of the working classes can be dispelled as a myth.

Marxism
Karl Marx, in a section of his Grundrisse that came to be known as the "Fragment on Machines", argued that the transition to a post-capitalist society combined with advances in automation would allow for significant reductions in labor needed to produce necessary goods, eventually reaching a point where all people would have significant amounts of leisure time to pursue science, the arts, and creative activities; a state some commentators later labeled as "post-scarcity". Marx argued that capitalism—the dynamic of economic growth based on capital accumulation—depends on exploiting the surplus labor of workers, but a post-capitalist society would allow for:

The free development of individualities, and hence not the reduction of necessary labour time so as to posit surplus labour, but rather the general reduction of the necessary labour of society to a minimum, which then corresponds to the artistic, scientific etc. development of the individuals in the time set free, and with the means created, for all of them.

Marx's concept of a post-capitalist communist society involves the free distribution of goods made possible by the abundance provided by automation. The fully developed communist economic system is postulated to develop from a preceding socialist system. Marx held the view that socialism—a system based on social ownership of the means of production—would enable progress toward the development of fully developed communism by further advancing productive technology. Under socialism, with its increasing levels of automation, an increasing proportion of goods would be distributed freely.

Marx did not believe in the elimination of most physical labor through technological advancements alone in a capitalist society, because he believed capitalism contained within it certain tendencies which countered increasing automation and prevented it from developing beyond a limited point, so that manual industrial labor could not be eliminated until the overthrow of capitalism. Some commentators on Marx have argued that at the time he wrote the Grundrisse, he thought that the collapse of capitalism due to advancing automation was inevitable despite these counter-tendencies, but that by the time of his major work Capital: Critique of Political Economy he had abandoned this view, and came to believe that capitalism could continually renew itself unless overthrown.

Fiction

The novella The Midas Plague by Frederik Pohl describes a world of cheap energy, in which robots are overproducing the commodities enjoyed by humankind. The lower-class "poor" must spend their lives in frantic consumption, trying to keep up with the robots' extravagant production, while the upper-class "rich" can live lives of simplicity.
The Mars trilogy by Kim Stanley Robinson. Over three novels, Robinson charts the terraforming of Mars as a human colony and the establishment of a post-scarcity society.
 The Culture novels by Iain M. Banks are centered on a post-scarcity economy where technology is advanced to such a degree that all production is automated, and there is no use for money or property (aside from personal possessions with sentimental value). People in the Culture are free to pursue their own interests in an open and socially-permissive society. The society has been described by some commentators as "communist-bloc" or "anarcho-communist". Banks' close friend and fellow science fiction writer Ken MacLeod has said that The Culture can be seen as a realization of Marx's communism, but adds that "however friendly he was to the radical left, Iain had little interest in relating the long-range possibility of utopia to radical politics in the here and now. As he saw it, what mattered was to keep the utopian possibility open by continuing technological progress, especially space development, and in the meantime to support whatever policies and politics in the real world were rational and humane."
 The Rapture of the Nerds by Cory Doctorow and Charles Stross takes place in a post-scarcity society and involves "disruptive" technology. The title is a derogatory term for the technological singularity coined by SF author Ken MacLeod.
 Con Blomberg's 1959 short story "Sales Talk" depicts a post-scarcity society in which society incentivizes consumption to reduce the burden of overproduction. To further reduce production, virtual reality is used to fulfill peoples' needs to create.
 The 24th-century human society of Star Trek: The Next Generation and Star Trek: Deep Space Nine has been labeled a post-scarcity society due to the ability of the fictional "replicator " technology to synthesize a wide variety of goods nearly instantaneously, along with dialogue such as Captain Picard's statement in the film Star Trek: First Contact that "The acquisition of wealth is no longer the driving force of our lives. We work to better ourselves and the rest of humanity." By the 22nd century, money had been rendered obsolete on Earth.
Cory Doctorow's novel Walkaway presents a modern take on the idea of post-scarcity. With the advent of 3D printing – and especially the ability to use these to fabricate even better fabricators – and with machines that can search for and reprocess waste or discarded materials, the protagonists no longer have need of regular society for the basic essentials of life, such as food, clothing and shelter.

See also

 Affluent society
 Bright green environmentalism
 Commons-based peer production
 Communist society
 Economic problem
 Futurology
 Jacque Fresco
 Imagination age
 Information society
 Knowledge economy
 New Frontier
 Post-capitalism
 Post-work society
 Progress
 Scarcity
 Scientism
 Technocentrism
 Technological utopianism
 Technological progress
 Techno-progressivism
 Universal basic income

References

Further reading 

 Abundance: The Future Is Better Than You Think by Peter Diamandis
 Bright Future: Abundance and Progress in the 21st Century by David McMullen
 Books by Martin Ford (author)
 The New Human Rights Movement: Reinventing the Economy to End Oppression by Peter Joseph
 Peoples' Capitalism: The Economics of the Robot Revolution by James Albus
 Post-Scarcity Anarchism by Murray Bookchin
 Trekonomics: The Economics of Star Trek by Manu Saadia
 The Zeitgeist Movement Defined: Realizing a New Train of Thought by Peter Joseph and TZM members 
 Zero Marginal Cost Society by Jeremy Rifkin
 Fully Automated Luxury Communism by Aaron Bastani
 The Best That Money Can't Buy by Jacque Fresco

Scarcity
Schools of economic thought
Science fiction themes
Technological utopianism